Ormesby Hall, a Grade I listed building, is a predominantly 18th-century mansion house built in the Palladian style and completed in 1754. It is situated in Ormesby,  Middlesbrough, North Yorkshire in the north-east of England.

The home of the Pennyman family, originally dating from c.1600, the property has been much modernised. Now described as a "classic Georgian mansion", it comprises a main residential block and an adjacent stable block. The stable block housed the horses of Cleveland Police Mounted Section until their disbandment in December 2013.

The Pennyman family, which began acquiring land in Ormesby in the 16th century, bought the Manor of Ormesby in about 1600 from the Conyers/Strangeways family. The Pennyman family then acquired a Baronetcy granted by Charles II for fighting on the side of the royalists in the English Civil War.  The Pennyman baronetcy became extinct in 1852 with the death of Sir William Pennyman. The Pennyman family continued to live in the house until 1983 when the National Trust opened the property and its  of land to the public after the death of Mrs Ruth Pennyman.

The house contains significant plasterwork, a Victorian kitchen and laundry areas, gardens and estate walks. There is also a model railway which is open to the public.

Ormesby Hall holds a range of events throughout the year.

References

   A History of the County of York North Riding: Volume 2 (1923) pp. 276-283 from British-History on Line

External links

 Ormesby Hall - National Trust

Country houses in North Yorkshire
National Trust properties in North Yorkshire
Grade I listed buildings in North Yorkshire
Historic house museums in North Yorkshire
Greater Eston
Buildings and structures in Redcar and Cleveland